Christoph Meier (born 27 October 1952) is a Swiss equestrian. He competed in the team eventing at the 1996 Summer Olympics.

References

External links
 
 
 

1952 births
Living people
Swiss male equestrians
Olympic equestrians of Switzerland
Equestrians at the 1996 Summer Olympics
Place of birth missing (living people)
20th-century Swiss people